Tirizis Island is the rocky island off the east coast of Robert Island in the South Shetland Islands, Antarctica extending 1.05 km in east-west direction and 350 m wide.  It is ending in Kitchen Point to the east, and separated from the main island to the west by a 100 m wide passage formed as a result of glacier retreat in the late first decade of 21st century.

The feature is named after the ancient Thracian town of Tirizis in northeastern Bulgaria.

Location

Maps
 L.L. Ivanov. Antarctica: Livingston Island and Greenwich, Robert, Snow and Smith Islands. Scale 1:120000 topographic map.  Troyan: Manfred Wörner Foundation, 2009.   (Updated second edition 2010.  )
Antarctic Digital Database (ADD). Scale 1:250000 topographic map of Antarctica. Scientific Committee on Antarctic Research (SCAR). Since 1993, regularly upgraded and updated.

References
 Tirizis Island. SCAR Composite Antarctic Gazetteer.
 Bulgarian Antarctic Gazetteer. Antarctic Place-names Commission. (details in Bulgarian, basic data in English)

External links
 Tirizis Island. Copernix satellite image

Islands of Robert Island
Bulgaria and the Antarctic